Friedrich Albrecht Carl Gren (1 May 1760 – 26 November 1798) was a German chemist and a native of Bernburg.

He began his career working in a pharmacy in Bernburg, and later worked as a pharmacist in Offenbach am Main and Erfurt. In 1782 he began his studies at the University of Helmstedt, and in 1788 became professor of chemistry and physics at the University of Halle.

In 1783 he became the assistant to Wenceslaus Johann Gustav Karsten at the University of Halle. In 1790 Friedrich Gren was founder of the Journal der Physik (in 1795-97 called Neues Journal der Physik), which in 1799 was renamed Annalen der Physik by Ludwig Wilhelm Gilbert (1769-1824). Today it is the oldest and one of the best-known journals on physics. He was also the author of a popular textbook on chemistry titled Systematisches Handbuch der gesamten Chemie.

Gren was a major proponent in regards to the existence of phlogiston. After Antoine-Laurent Lavoisier (1743-1794) demonstrated that combustion required oxygen, he compromised his beliefs, and postulated that oxygen and phlogiston worked alongside each other.

Selected writings 
 Betrachtungen über die Gärung, (Reflections on fermentation), 1784 
 Systematisches Handbuch der gesamten Chemie, (Systematic textbook on all chemistry), 1787-1794, last edition- 1819 (1787-1790) Digital edition / (1806-1807) Digital edition by the University and State Library Düsseldorf
 Grundriss der Naturlehre, 1787, sixth edition- 1820 Digital 5th edition from 1808 by the University and State Library Düsseldorf

Footnotes

References 
 This article is based on a translation of an article from the German Wikipedia.
 

1760 births
1798 deaths
People from Bernburg
18th-century German chemists
University of Helmstedt alumni
Academic staff of the University of Halle